The Vanuatu women's national under-20 football team is the highest women's youth team of women's football in Vanuatu and is controlled by the Vanuatu Football Federation.

OFC Championship Record

Current squad
The following players were called up for the 2019 OFC U-19 Women's Championship from 30 August–12 September in Avarua, the Cook Islands.

Caps and goals updated as of 6 September 2019, after the game against Fiji.

References

Oceanian women's national under-20 association football teams
women's